Mengla County (Tai Lue: , Mueang La;) is a county under the jurisdiction of the Xishuangbanna Dai Autonomous Prefecture, in far southern Yunnan province, China. Meng is a variation of  Mueang.

Name
"Mongla", "Mengla" and "Meungla" are different romanizations of the same Tai word. Thus, to differentiate Mengla County in China and Mong La Township in Myanmar, the locals call the former Greater Mengla/Mongla while the latter Lesser Mongla/Mengla.

Administrative divisions
Mengla County has 8 towns and 2 townships. 

8 Towns: Mengla, Mengpeng, Mengman, Menglun, Mohan, Mengban, Guanlei, and Yiwu
2 Ethnic Townships: Yi Xiangming and Yao Yaoqu

Biodiversity
Xishuangbanna Tropical Botanical Garden, of the Chinese Academy of Sciences (CAS), is located in Menglun in Mengla County, covering an area of more than 1000 ha. Over 13,000 species of tropical plants are preserved in its 35 living collections.

The last Indochinese tiger in the wild in China is believed to have been killed near Mengla in 2009. The perpetrator is believed to have been sentenced to 12 years imprisonment for this. 

A tiny frog, Raorchestes menglaensis (known as the Zhishihe's bubble-nest frog or Mengla small treefrog) is only known from its type locality, Zhishihe in Mengla County.

Climate
Mengla has a tropical savanna climate (Köppen Aw) with strong monsoonal influences. Summer is long and there is virtually no "winter" as such; instead, there is a dry season (December thru April) and wet season (May thru October). However, high temperatures reach their peak in April before the onset of the monsoon from the Indian Ocean.

Transport
Nearest airport is Xishuangbanna Gasa
China National Highway 213
Asian Highway Network AH3
Kunming-Bangkok Expressway
Yuxi–Mohan Railway

See also
 Mong La
 Muang La 
 Muong La

References

External links

 Mengla County Official Website

County-level divisions of Xishuangbanna Prefecture